Koker is a surname. Notable people with the surname include:

Danny Koker, (1933–2008), American baritone and pianist
Danny Koker, aka "The Count", American motorcycle and automobile restoration expert
David Koker (1921–1945), Dutch Jewish student and Holocaust victim whose diary was published